Psilorhynchus hamiltoni is a freshwater ray-finned fish, from the Tista River in West Bengal, India.

Etymology
The fish is named in honor of Francis Buchanan-Hamilton.

References

hamiltoni
Freshwater fish of India
Endemic fauna of India
Taxa named by Kevin W. Conway
Taxa named by Heok Hee Ng
Fish described in 2013